Anna Felice is a Maltese judge. She and Abigail Lofaro were the first female judges in Malta in 2006.

See also 
Judiciary of Malta

References 

21st-century Maltese judges
Living people
Date of birth missing (living people)
Maltese women
Year of birth missing (living people)
20th-century women judges
21st-century women judges